The Roman Catholic Diocese of Masbate (Latin: Dioecesis Masbatensis) is a diocese of the Latin Church of the Catholic Church in the Philippines. The seat of the bishop is the Cathedral Parish of Saint Anthony of Padua along Quezon Street, Masbate City.

The diocese has experienced no jurisdictional changes and is suffragan to the Archdiocese of Cáceres. Its patron is Saint Anthony of Padua.

History 
With the other provinces of Bicol, Masbate once belonged to the Archdiocese of Cáceres. When Cáceres was elevated to the status of an archdiocese on June 29, 1951, Masbate became part of the newly erected Diocese of Sorsogon. Pope Paul VI created the Diocese of Masbate on March 23, 1968. It was formally inaugurated on September 25, 1968, with Msgr. Porfírio Rivera Iligan, a priest from the Archdiocese of Cáceres, as its first bishop.

Ordinaries

Vicars-General
The Vicar-General assists the bishop in the administrative duties over the diocese. The Offices of the Vicar General and the Episcopal Vicars temporarily ceased upon the vacancy of the episcopal see.
Very Rev. Msgr. Anacleto Golimlim, P.A (†)
Very Rev. Msgr. Arturo Lachica, H.P (†)
Very Rev. Msgr. Claro Caluya III, H.P (1984–2009)
Very Rev. Msgr. Ismael Misolas, P.C (2009)
Very Rev. Fr. Eusebio Llonoso (2011–present)

See also
Masbate Cathedral
Catholic Church in the Philippines

Resources
The 2010–2011 Catholic Directory of the Philippines (published by Claretian Publications for the Catholic Bishops' Conference of the Philippines, 2010)

Religion in Masbate
Christian organizations established in 1968
Masbate
Roman Catholic dioceses and prelatures established in the 20th century
Masbate